Proteins in this family have been predicted to function as AdoMet-dependent methyltransferases.

References 

Protein families